"Welcome to the Jungle" is a 1987 song by Guns N' Roses.

Welcome to the Jungle may also refer to:

Books and comics
 Welcome to the Jungle (comics), a prequel to Jim Butcher's The Dresden Files book series, 2008
 Welcome to the Jungle: New Positions in Black Cultural Studies, a book by Kobena Mercer, 1994

Film and television
 Welcome to the Jungle (2003 film), also known as The Rundown, an American film
 Welcome to the Jungle (2007 film), an American horror film
 Welcome to the Jungle (2013 film), an American comedy film starring Jean-Claude Van Damme 
 "Welcome to the Jungle" (Entourage), an episode of Entourage, 2007
 "Welcome to the Jungle" (Legends of Tomorrow), an episode of Legends of Tomorrow
 "Welcome to the Jungle", an episode of Power Rangers Jungle Fury, 2008
 Jumanji: Welcome to the Jungle, 2017 film

Music
 Welcome to the Jungle (Franco "El Gorila" album), 2009
 Welcome to the Jungle (Neon Jungle album), 2014 
 "Welcome to the Jungle" (Neon Jungle song), the album's title track
 "Welcome to the Jungle" (Jay-Z and Kanye West song), 2011
 "Welcome to the Jungle", a 2013 song by Hardwell, with Alvaro and Mercer, featuring Lil Jon, from Hardwell presents 'Revealed Volume 4'